Hipermercado Géant is Uruguay's largest supermarket and is owned by Grupo Disco Casino (composed 50% by Grupo Casino and 50% by Supermercados Disco del Uruguay) and is the only supermarket under the Géant brand in Uruguay.

It is located just outside the capital city Montevideo on the east, and over one of the most important access streets to Montevideo, Giannattasio Avenue, which connects Montevideo with the so call Ciudad de la Costa, the fastest growing area in Uruguay in the recent years. Although the surrounding is not very highly populated, it attracts buyers from both the east part of Montevideo and the Ciudad de la Costa due to being relatively close to both areas, being easily accessible by car and its low prices.

History
Hipermercado Géant traces its history back to the 19th century, when Groupe Casino was formed in France, in 1898. In 1901, Groupe Casino became officially incorporated as a company.

On September 29, 1999, Hipermercado Géant Uruguay opened its first branch in that South American country, initially employing 900 persons.  In 2001, Hipermercado Géant joined the rest of the Géant companies around the world to celebrate the 100th anniversary of Groupe Casino's registration as a company in France.

According to company numbers, Hipermercado Géant receives about $30,000,000 dollars in yearly earnings.

External links
 Géant's Home Page - In Spanish

Supermarkets of Uruguay
Grupo Éxito